Mortonville Hotel is a historic hotel located in East Fallowfield Township, Chester County, Pennsylvania. It was built in 1796 as a dwelling, and converted to a hotel in 1849.  It is a three-story, seven bay, stuccoed stone structure with a shallow gable roof.  It is partially banked, and features first and second floor verandahs.

It was added to the National Register of Historic Places in 1985.

References

Hotel buildings on the National Register of Historic Places in Pennsylvania
Houses completed in 1796
Buildings and structures in Chester County, Pennsylvania
National Register of Historic Places in Chester County, Pennsylvania
1796 establishments in Pennsylvania